Dorstenia colombiana is a plant species in the family Moraceae.

It is endemic to Colombia.

References

colombiana
Endemic flora of Colombia
Plants described in 1956